Dalaneh (also Romanized as Dālāneh; also known as Dowlāneh) is a village in Soleyman Rural District, Soleyman District, Zaveh County, Razavi Khorasan Province, Iran. At the 2006 census, its population was 19, in 5 families.

References 

Populated places in Zaveh County